Associação Cultural e Recreativa Alvorense 1º Dezembro (abbreviated as ACR Alvorense 1 Dezembro or ACRA 1 Dezembro) is a Portuguese football club based in Alvor, Portimão in the Algarve.

Background
ACR Alvorense 1 Dezembro currently plays in the AF Algarve – 1ª Divisão which is the fifth tier of Portuguese football. The club was founded in 1934 and they play their home matches at the Estádio da Restinga in Alvor, Portimão. Up until 1999/2000 the club was known as Grupo Desportivo Recreativo Alvorense (abbreviated as GDR Alvorense). The most successful period in the club's history was from 1980 until 1991 when they spent 9 seasons in the Terceira Divisão, which until 1990 was the third tier of Portuguese football. Their best season was in 1983/84 when the club finished 4th in Série F.

The club is affiliated to Associação de Futebol do Algarve and has competed in the AF Algarve Taça. The club has also entered the national cup known as Taça de Portugal and has completed 17 games in the competition.

Season to season

Source:

Notable players
 Hélder Lourenço
 Paulo José Rocha

Footnotes

Football clubs in Portugal
Association football clubs established in 1934
1934 establishments in Portugal